Irvington is a home rule-class city in Breckinridge County, Kentucky, in the United States. The population was 1,181 at the 2010 census.

Geography
Irvington is located at  (37.878966, -86.284637).

History
The local post office was first established as Merino (for the nearby Mt. Merino Seminary) on February 16, 1885. However, two area businessmen, R.M. Jolly and Edgar L. Bennett, anticipating the route of the Louisville, St. Louis, and Texas Railroad, purchased  of farmland at the site and then, with the help of the railroad's employees, platted a new community over the 1888–89 winter. This was named for Irvington, New York, the hometown of the railroad's chief engineer, Eugene Cornwall. Irvington was formally incorporated by the state assembly in 1889.

Demographics

As of the census of 2000, there were 1,257 people, 512 households, and 345 families residing in the city. The racial makeup of the city was 83.93% White, 14.40% African American, 0.40% Native American, 0.32% Asian, 0.08% Pacific Islander, 0.08% from other races, and 0.80% from two or more races. Hispanic or Latino of any race were 1.03% of the population.

There were 512 households, out of which 33.8% had children under the age of 18 living with them, 44.7% were married couples living together, 18.6% had a female householder with no husband present, and 32.6% were non-families. 29.5% of all households were made up of individuals, and 15.2% had someone living alone who was 65 years of age or older. The average household size was 2.46 and the average family size was 3.01.

In the city, the population was spread out, with 29.2% under the age of 18, 7.6% from 18 to 24, 25.9% from 25 to 44, 20.5% from 45 to 64, and 16.7% who were 65 years of age or older. The median age was 36 years. For every 100 females, there were 84.3 males. For every 100 females age 18 and over, there were 82.0 males.

The median income for a household in the city was $27,105, and the median income for a family was $32,500. Males had a median income of $29,375 versus $23,214 for females. The per capita income for the city was $15,269. About 18.1% of families and 21.3% of the population were below the poverty line, including 34.8% of those under age 18 and 6.7% of those age 65 or over.

Climate
The climate in this area is characterized by hot, humid summers and generally mild to cool winters.  According to the Köppen Climate Classification system, Irvington has a humid subtropical climate, abbreviated "Cfa" on climate maps.

Education
Irvington has a public library, a branch of the Breckinridge County Public Library.

References

External links
City of Irvington official website

Populated places established in 1888
Cities in Breckinridge County, Kentucky
Cities in Kentucky